Twing.com was a search engine specializing in internet forum content, located in Jersey City, New Jersey, with data centers around the world. Twing.com used vertical searching as a forum search service that seeks out communities based on common forum formats. The product disappeared from the Web in late November, 2008, when the product division's parent company Accoona ceased business operations.

Twing.com did not use the typical web crawler method but recognizes the footprint and structure of forum content and indexes such content according to its context, and then allows for word sense disambiguation of concepts through use of topical category and other filters.

Additionally, prior to ceasing operations, Twing.com began collecting and indexing content from Twitter and other real-time user generated content sources.

Content disambiguation
To allow for disambiguation, Twing.com is utilizing interface concepts such as Faceted Search and Filtering in the Search Engine Result Pages, (SERPs). These are advanced search methods  that attempt to assist users with their information foraging efforts by keeping them on an information scent trail.

Category filters, based on the directory taxonomy, are one of the filtering methods available. This is an attempt to solve the generalized search problem of ambiguity that often occurs in search results as well as forum search results. A good example might be the word "bass." If you do a search for bass on Wikipedia, you get a disambiguation page to determine if the phrase in this case means a musical instrument, a company name, part of a place name, a beverage, and other options. While adding key terms to a search may sometimes collapse ambiguities, doing so can also exclude things of value. So category filters can help solve the problem of ambiguity in search engine results, whether such search engines are forum search specific or not. Additional filters are available based on language entity extraction from content and proprietary algorithms and dictionaries. Twing.com's use of such technology is discernible from seeing the filters available within the search results pages.

Forum content collection
The Twing.com robot, (called Twingbot), was designed to understand the formats of Internet Forums, (a.k.a. Bulletin Boards or Discussion Groups.) While the Twing.com product was open to the world in January, 2008, the Twingbot robot had been observed 'in the wild' at least several months earlier. (The Twingbot robot had identified itself as User-Agent: Twingbot/1.0 and formerly had its own descriptive web page at www.twingbot.com/)

See also
 Internet forum
 Web search engine
 Vertical search
 List of search engines
 Word sense disambiguation

References

External links
 Some Historical Screen Shots of Twing Community Search Product from November, 2008 prior to closing of parent company Accoona
 PC Magazine Search Without Google Part II Page 1 and Part II Page 2
 Affiliate Marketing Forum
 ABC News: Ahead of the Curve
 AppScout: Twing - Search Forums and Discover Communities
 Mashable: Twing Buzz Graphs
 Red Ferret Journal March 11, 2008 Article
 SEO Roundtable: Search SEO Forums and More with Twing
 Tech2All: Twing - The Forum Search Engine
 About Buzz Reputation Tracking in Forums
 Twing: Searching the Deep Web

Internet search engines
Companies based in Jersey City, New Jersey